Edmund Arwaker was Archdeacon of Armagh from 1691 until 1693.

Arwaker was born in Kilkenny and educated at Trinity College, Dublin. He was Chaplain to the Duke of Ormond; Canon of Kildare from 1681 to 1686; and held livings at Drumglass and Killyman.

Notes

17th-century Irish Anglican priests
Archdeacons of Armagh
Alumni of Trinity College Dublin
People from County Kilkenny